The Australian Minister for Communications has overall responsibility for broadcasting, the information and communications technology industry, the information economy, and telecommunications within Australia. The portfolio is currently held by Michelle Rowland in the Albanese ministry since 1 June 2022, following the Australian federal election in 2022.

In the Government of Australia, the ministers administer the portfolio through the Department of Infrastructure, Transport, Regional Development, Communications and the Arts.

Scope
Portfolio agencies and bodies include:

 Australian Broadcasting Corporation
 Australian Communications and Media Authority
 Australia Post
 Australian Classification Board
 National Library of Australia
 NBN Co
 Special Broadcasting Service

List of ministers
The minister responsible for telecommunications policy has had various titles. From 1901 until December 1975 it was the Postmaster-General, who administered the portfolio through the Postmaster-General's Department.

The following individuals have been appointed as Minister for Communications, or any of its precedent titles:

Notes
 Barnard served as part of a two-man ministry together with Gough Whitlam for fourteen days, until the full ministry was commissioned.
 On , the third Hawke ministry implemented a two-level ministerial structure, with distinctions drawn between senior and junior ministers. This arrangement has been continued by subsequent ministries. Junior ministers are shown in the table below.

List of ministers for regional communications
The following individuals have been appointed as Minister for Regional Communications, or any of its precedent titles:

List of ministers for digital transformation
On , the third Hawke Ministry implemented a two-level ministerial structure, with distinctions drawn between senior and junior ministers. This arrangement has been continued by subsequent ministries; however, junior ministers have been appointed in the telecommunications portfolio on only five occasions. Senior ministers are shown in the table above.

The following individuals have been appointed as the Minister for Digital Transformation, or any of its precedent titles:

References

External links
 

Communications
Australia
NBN Co